Dillard Barn is a historic tobacco barn for curing leaves close to  Mullins, Marion County, South Carolina. It was built in about 1894–95, and is a single-pen plan, log barn supported by a brick foundation with a dirt floor. It was used for curing tobacco from its construction until 1981.

It was listed in the National Register of Historic Places in 2005.

References

Barns on the National Register of Historic Places in South Carolina
Buildings and structures completed in 1895
Buildings and structures in Marion County, South Carolina
National Register of Historic Places in Marion County, South Carolina
Barns in South Carolina
Tobacco buildings in the United States
Tobacco barns